Season 4 of the Indian competitive reality TV series MasterChef India premiered on Star Plus on 26 January 2015 and aired from Monday through Saturday at 10:30 pm IST.

Vikas Khanna and Sanjeev Kapoor returned as judges while Kunal Kapur was replaced by Ranveer Brar. Gunjan Joshi also returned as writer after season 3.

The show also had Vighnesh Pande as a comic relief for a special episode with his puppet character 'Tito' disguised as a wild card entrance to roast the contestants, judges and the host of the season.

21-year-old student Nikita Gandhi, who is a non-resident Indian and person of Indian origin, was announced as the winner on 12 April 2015. Neha Deepak Shah and Bhakti Arora were the first and second runner-ups respectively.

Format
From nationwide auditions, the judges picked 12 home cooks that advanced to the main competition. Unlike the other seasons, this season was exclusively focused on vegetarian cooking alone.

Top 12
The top 12 contestants were revealed on 7 February 2015.

References

MasterChef India
2015 Indian television seasons